Cockatoo Island ferry wharf is located on Sydney Harbour serving Cockatoo Island.

History
When the Cockatoo Island Dockyard was in operation, Sydney Ferries Limited operated services to the island at shift changeover times.

In April 2007, the wharf reopened for a three-month trial coinciding with the reopening of the island as a tourist attraction. It is also the terminus for all stops Cockatoo Island services from Circular Quay. The single wharf is served by First Fleet and RiverCat class ferries.

Wharves & services

References

External links

Cockatoo Island Wharf at Transport for New South Wales (Archived 11 June 2019)

Cockatoo Island (New South Wales)
Ferry wharves in Sydney